Copturus is a genus of true weevils in the beetle family Curculionidae. There are more than 190 described species in Copturus.

See also
 List of Copturus species

References

Further reading

 
 
 

Weevils